Stéphane Lecat (born August 6, 1971, Nogent-sur-Marne) is a former long-distance swimmer from France. He won a gold medal at the European Championships in the 25 km open water. He successfully swam the English Channel on 23 August 2003 in a time of 8 h 19 mins

References

French male freestyle swimmers
French male long-distance swimmers
Male long-distance swimmers
1971 births
Living people
Place of birth missing (living people)
World Aquatics Championships medalists in open water swimming